was a town located in Hikami District, Hyōgo Prefecture, Japan.

As of 2003, the town had an estimated population of 13,268 and a density of 135.17 persons per km2. The total area was 98.16 km2.

On November 1, 2004, Sannan, along with the towns of Hikami, Aogaki, Ichijima, Kaibara and Kasuga (all from Hikami District), was merged to create the city of Tamba and no longer exists as an independent municipality.

External links
 Official website of Sannan in Japanese

Dissolved municipalities of Hyōgo Prefecture
Tamba, Hyōgo